Ivernia may refer to:
 Land of the Iverni, in southwest Ireland
 Hibernia, the island of Ireland
 SS Ivernia, liner launched 1899, torpedoed 1917
 RMS Ivernia, liner launched 1954, scrapped 2004; aka RMS Franconia, SS Feodor Shalyapin 
 British Rail Class 40 diesel locomotive D221, built by English Electric at Newton-le-Willows, Lancashire